The 1965 North Carolina Tar Heels football team represented the University of North Carolina at Chapel Hill during the 1965 NCAA University Division football season. The Tar Heels were led by seventh-year head coach Jim Hickey and played their home games at Kenan Memorial Stadium in Chapel Hill, North Carolina.

Schedule

References

North Carolina
North Carolina Tar Heels football seasons
North Carolina Tar Heels football